University Park is a city in Dallas County, Texas, United States of America, in suburban Dallas. The population was 23,068 at the 2010 census. The city is home to Southern Methodist University.

University Park is bordered on the north, east and west by Dallas and on the south by the town of Highland Park. University Park and Highland Park together comprise the Park Cities, an enclave of Dallas. University Park is one of the most affluent places in Texas based on per capita income; it is ranked #12. In 2018, data from the American Community Survey revealed that University Park was the 2nd wealthiest city in the United States with a median household income of $198,438 and a poverty rate of 4.2%.

Addresses in University Park may use either "Dallas, Texas" or "University Park, Texas" as the city designation, although the United States Postal Service prefers the use of the "Dallas, Texas" designation for the sake of simplicity. The same is true for mail sent to Highland Park.

History

University Park began as a cluster of homes surrounding the fledgling Southern Methodist University, which was founded in the then-rural Dallas County in 1915. The university supplied these homes with utility service until 1924, when the growing population could no longer be supported by the school's utilities. In response, the area's homeowners first sought annexation into the town of Highland Park, but were refused due to the high cost that would have been required to provide the necessary utility and safety services. Shortly thereafter, Dallas also refused a request for annexation on similar grounds.

Community leaders organized to incorporate as a separate individual city. According to state law, incorporation required that area residents hold an election on the issue before the new city could be officially formed and recognized. On April 24, 1924, voters approved the measure by a 5:1 margin. Operating under the commission form of government, the city began the work of shaping the new government and addressing the pressing need to establish basic municipal services. To provide for the financial needs of the city, another election was held soon thereafter to authorize the issuance of municipal bonds. Passing by a near unanimous margin, the $150,000 bond issue funded the installation of a new water supply system, street paving, and the construction of a new city hall and fire station. When first incorporated, the city encompassed , 380 homes, and 1200 residents.

As a result of efforts to build and improve the city, University Park grew to a population of over 20,000 residents by 1945 and had become one of the most prestigious locations in the area. In fact, the community's attractiveness and tax value had risen to such an extent that the city of Dallas now wanted to annex University Park into its boundaries. At the time of the election, even the Board of Commissioners favored the annexation. In the largest voter turnout to that date and still one of the largest in city history, the annexation was denied by a 53% to 47% margin.

In 1946 an election to adopt a Home Rule Charter was held, but the measure failed and the city continued to operate as a General Law city. In 1989, voters approved a Home Rule Charter which officially adopted a council-manager form of government and expanded the three member board of Commissioners into a five-member city council.

Since the 1940s, the population and area of University Park has stabilized at 24,000 residents and 2,350 acres (4.7 square miles). The city is now surrounded by Dallas on three sides and the town of Highland Park to the south.

Originally University Park was a middle class community. Highland Park residents spearheaded the creation of the Highland Park Independent School District and asked the neighbors to the north to become a part of the district; taxes were lower since the district included University Park's population. HPISD had no racial diversity in the 1950s and 1960s, when other Dallas-area school districts dealt with racial integration and white flight. The federal court orders to integrate had no effect in HPISD since it did not receive federal money. As a result, values of HPISD-zoned properties in University Park rose dramatically and the demographic makeup became wealthier, with smaller houses being replaced by larger ones circa the 1970s.

Geography

Demographics

As of the 2020 United States census, there were 25,278 people, 7,593 households, and 6,358 families residing in the city.

Politics

The city of University Park has consistently supported Republican presidential candidates in recent years. The seven most recent campaigns from 1996 to 2020 each earned over 60% of the city's vote, with the best showing being the 81.44% of the vote won by Texas native George W. Bush in 2000. However, the city's vote total is getting progressively more competitive, with Donald Trump only taking 63% of the 2020 vote compared to Mitt Romney, who took 81% of the city's votes in 2012.

Education

Primary and secondary schools

University Park is served by the Highland Park Independent School District (HPISD). As such, it is served by the HPISD's McCulloch Intermediate School and Highland Park Middle School (which share a campus located partially in Highland Park and partially in University Park), and Highland Park High School located in University Park. There are two HPISD elementary schools located in University Park (Hyer and University Park), two HPISD elementary schools located in neighboring Highland Park (Armstrong and Bradfield) and one elementary school located in the city of Dallas (Michael M. Boone Elementary). All five elementary schools serve sections of the UP city limits.

A small portion of University Park west of North Central Expressway is in the Dallas Independent School District. It is however not zoned for residential purposes.

Colleges, universities, and institutions

Southern Methodist University is located in the city of University Park.  The Meadows Museum, which houses the largest collection of Spanish art in the United States, can be found on the campus.  The George W. Bush Presidential Center, the presidential library for George W. Bush, can also be found on the campus, and was opened in 2013.

All of Dallas County (University Park included) is in the service area of Dallas College (formerly Dallas County Community College).

Public libraries

The new University Park Public Library location is the second floor of Preston Center Plaza. The old location was the first floor of a Chase Bank building at the southern end of Snider Plaza, at the intersection of Daniel and Hillcrest. The owner of the former building, Albert Huddleston, charged the city $1 per year to use the building space, as of 2009.

The library opened on June 7, 2001, as the University Park Book Bank in Snider Plaza. Before this, the town had no library. Residents could pay to use the Highland Park Public Library or the Dallas Public Library. On April 1, 2002, the book bank became a municipal library.

Parks and recreation

The City of University Park operates several parks. They include Burleson Park, Caruth Park, Coffee Park, Curtis Park, Elena's Children's Park, Germany Park, Goar Park, Linear Park, Smith Park, and Williams Park.

Burleson Park was named after James B. Burleson, who served as the Mayor Pro-tem and the city commissioner. University Park mayor H. E. Yarbrough dedicated the park on September 5, 1947. Elena Children's Park was named after Mary Elena Franklin, a girl who died at the age of three in an automobile accident on August 2, 1997. Over 500 corporations, families, and foundations contributed to the park.

The Holmes Aquatic Center, within Curtis Park, has a  pool,  and  diving boards, a water slide, and an accessibility ramp. The park also has a pool for younger children and a  sprayground. University Park residents and residents of the Highland Park Independent School District are permitted to use the park. The city operates six tennis courts available only to University Park residents. Parks with tennis courts include Burleson, Caruth, Curtis, Germany, Smith, and Williams.

The Moody Family YMCA is in University Park. It was formerly known as the Park Cities-North Dallas Branch YMCA. Circa 2014 its previous building was to be demolished, and the YMCA leased  in Preston Center for the period until its new building would open. It received its current name after the Moody Foundation donated $8 million in 2013 with the new name on the new building.

Gallery

Notable people

 John Hinckley, Jr., would-be assassin of President Ronald Reagan grew up in University Park and a graduate of Highland Park High School
 Morgan Meyer, Republican state representative from District 108; resides in University Park
 Colin Ridgway
 Doak Walker, 1948 Heisman Trophy winner at SMU, 1945 graduate of Highland Park High School

References

External links

 
 University Park, Texas at the Handbook of Texas
 McCulloch Intermediate School/Highland Park Middle School
 Robert S. Hyer Elementary School
 University Park Elementary School

Cities in the Dallas–Fort Worth metroplex
Cities in Dallas County, Texas
Cities in Texas
Populated places established in 1924